Karate competitions at the 2021 Southeast Asian Games took place at Ninh Bình Province Sports Gymnasium in Ninh Bình, Vietnam from 18 to 20 May 2022.

Medal table

Medalists

Kata

Kumite

Men

Women

References

Karate
2021